Graham Lee Rennison (born 2 October 1978) is an English former professional footballer who played as a defender in the Football League for York City, and in non-League football for Whitby Town.

References

External links

1978 births
Living people
People from Northallerton
Sportspeople from Yorkshire
English footballers
Association football defenders
York City F.C. players
Whitby Town F.C. players
English Football League players